Simon Sikes (born December 7, 2000) is an American racing driver. He currently competes in the U.S. F2000 National Championship with Legacy Autosport.

Racing record

Career summary 

*Season still in progress.

American open-wheel racing results

SCCA National Championship Runoffs

U.S. F2000 National Championship 
(key) (Races in bold indicate pole position) (Races in italics indicate fastest lap) (Races with * indicate most race laps led)

*Season still in progress.

References 

2000 births
Living people
Racing drivers from Atlanta
Racing drivers from Georgia (U.S. state)
Formula Ford drivers
SCCA National Championship Runoffs participants
U.S. F2000 National Championship drivers